Perafita, Lavra e Santa Cruz do Bispo is a civil parish in the municipality of Matosinhos, Portugal. It was formed in 2013 by the merger of the former parishes Perafita, Lavra and Santa Cruz do Bispo. The population in 2011 was 29,407, in an area of 22.65 km². It is crossed by the A28 (Porto / Valença). The Porto Airport is situated in its territory.

References

Freguesias of Matosinhos